Purlyga (Purlığa) is a rural locality (a village) in Bazlyksky Selsoviet, Bizhbulyaksky District, Bashkortostan, Russia. The population was 67 as of 2010. There is 1 street.

Geography 
Purlyga is located 16 km northeast of Bizhbulyak (the district's administrative centre) by road. Ittikhat is the nearest rural locality.

References 

Rural localities in Bizhbulyaksky District